Master Harold and the Boys may refer to:

 "Master Harold"...and the Boys, a play by Athol Fugard
 Master Harold...and the Boys (1985 film), starring Matthew Broderick
 Master Harold...and the Boys (2010 film), starring Freddie Highmore